Yedina, also known as Buduma (Boudouma), is a Chadic language of the Biu–Mandara branch spoken around Lake Chad in western Chad and neighbouring Cameroon and Nigeria.

200 speakers live in Cameroon, and the rest live in Chad.

See also 
 Buduma people

Notes

References 
 Louise McKone.  1993.  "A Phonological Description of Yedəna (Buduma), Language of Lake Chad," University of Texas at Arlington MA thesis.
 Elhadji Ari Awagana. 2001. "Grammatik des Buduma: Phonologie, Morphologie, Syntax," LIT Verlag Berlin-Hamburg-Münster, 

Biu-Mandara languages
Languages of Chad
Languages of Cameroon
Languages of Nigeria